The Church of St Martin in Kingsbury Episcopi, Somerset, England, dates from the 14th century and has been designated as a Grade I listed building.

There is a four-bay aisled nave. Pevsner describes the chancel and chapels of the church as "gloriously lit" and advises visiting on a fine morning. He writes that the nave is older than the rest of the church, "no doubt of before 1400, and not yet infected with the later exuberance" of the Late Perpendicular style of the tower and other parts of St Martin's.

The four-stage tower is supported by buttresses and has bands of blank quatrefoils, and is surmounted by battlements with pinnacles.

The church was renovated between 1845 and 1849.

The parish is part of the benefice of Kingsbury Episcopi, East Lambrook and Hambridge within the deanery of Crewkerne and Ilminster.

See also

 Grade I listed buildings in South Somerset
 List of Somerset towers
 List of ecclesiastical parishes in the Diocese of Bath and Wells

References

14th-century church buildings in England
Church of England church buildings in South Somerset
Grade I listed churches in Somerset
Grade I listed buildings in South Somerset